James Harvie Wilkinson III (born September 29, 1944) is an American jurist who serves as a United States circuit judge on the United States Court of Appeals for the Fourth Circuit. His name has been raised at several junctures in the past as a possible nominee to the United States Supreme Court.

Early and family life
Wilkinson was born in New York City, New York to J. Harvie Wilkinson Jr. and his wife. He was raised in Richmond, Virginia, where he attended St. Christopher's School during the state's Massive Resistance crisis concerning desegregation of the public schools. His father (CEO of State Planters Bank, later part of Crestar Bank) joined with Norfolk and Western Railroad CEO Stuart Saunders and Richmond School Board President (and later Supreme Court Justice) Lewis F. Powell and others to support Governor J. Lindsay Almond when he decided to break with the Byrd Organization and adhere to the decisions of the Virginia Supreme Court and a three judge federal panel on January 19, 1959, which declared certain new laws designed to maintain segregation unconstitutional.

Wilkinson attended the Lawrenceville School in New Jersey, then Yale University, where he was a member of St. Anthony Hall, chairman of the Conservative Party of the Yale Political Union, and later the Political Union's president. He graduated with honors from Yale with a Bachelor of Arts degree in 1967, then published his first book, Harry Byrd and The Changing Face of Virginia Politics, 1945–1966 (1968) Wilkinson enlisted in the United States Army in 1968 and served until 1969.

Upon leaving the army, Wilkinson began law school at the University of Virginia School of Law in Charlottesville. In 1970, after completing only one year, Wilkinson took a leave of absence to run (at age 25) for a Virginia seat in the United States House of Representatives. He ran as a Republican against 3-term incumbent Democrat David E. Satterfield III and later joked about losing by a significant margin, noting that Satterfield had a billboard urging voters to send Wilkinson back to law school. Wilkinson then resumed his legal studies and graduated with a Juris Doctor in 1972 (when Satterfield faced no opposition) and soon passed the Virginia bar exam.

Wilkinson and his wife have two children. His daughter Porter Wilkinson also clerked for the United States Supreme Court, serving in the chambers of Chief Justice John Roberts in 2007–2008.

Early legal, teaching and writing career
From 1972 to 1973, Wilkinson served as a law clerk to newly confirmed Justice Powell, long a family friend. Following his clerkship, Wilkinson declined joining a large law firm. Instead, he returned to Charlottesville and joined the University of Virginia School of Law faculty, where he taught as an associate professor for five years. Wilkinson also wrote and published his second book, about his clerkship with Justice Powell: Serving Justice: A Supreme Court Clerk's View (1974).

Wilkinson also spent three years (1978–1981) working for Norfolk's The Virginian-Pilot, including as editorial page editor. He later credited this with broadening his practical experience of both government at many levels, and with people in all walks of life, as well as helping his time management skills. In 1979, Wilkinson published his third book, From Brown to Bakke. In 1982, Wilkinson resumed his legal career, joining the Civil Rights Division of the U.S. Department of Justice, eventually becoming deputy assistant attorney general.

Federal judicial service
On November 10, 1983, as Wilkinson briefly returned to teach at the University of Virginia School of Law as a full professor, President Ronald Reagan nominated him to the United States Court of Appeals for the Fourth Circuit seat vacated by Judge John D. Butzner Jr., who retired. Despite some controversy and after hearings on November 16, 1983, and February 22, 1984, the United States Senate confirmed Wilkinson on August 9, 1984, by a 58–39 vote. He received his commission on August 13, 1984.

From 1996 to 2003, Wilkinson served as the court's chief judge, during which time he wrote and published his fourth book, One Nation Indivisible: How Ethnic Separatism Threatens America (1997). In 2003, Judge Wilkinson wrote the majority opinion upholding the right of the United States government to detain Yaser Esam Hamdi indefinitely without access to counsel or a court. Hamdi was a U.S. citizen captured during the U.S. invasion of Afghanistan, and the U.S. Supreme Court ultimately overturned that decision.

With the announcement of Chief Justice Rehnquist's illness in the fall of 2004, many commentators listed Wilkinson as a potential Bush nominee to the Supreme Court. Wilkinson agreed to an interview with The New York Times, reportedly undermining his candidacy amongst the Bush inner circle.

In 2006, Wilkinson penned an op-ed article in The Washington Post, castigating both the left and right on the issue of gay marriage. Writing that the "American constitutional tradition" has been a "chief casualty in the struggle over same-sex marriage", Wilkinson opined that marriage should be regulated through ordinary legislative means and opposed "the rush to constitutionalize" the dispute.

On June 24, 2008, Wilkinson authored a concurring opinion in Richmond Medical Center For Women v. Herring, which upheld the Virginia ban on partial-birth abortions. In his concurrence, he voiced a strong opposition to the practice of partial-birth abortions: "The fact is that we—civilized people—are retreating to the haven of our Constitution to justify dismembering a partly born child and crushing its skull. Surely centuries hence, people will look back on this gruesome practice done in the name of fundamental law by a society of high achievement. And they will shudder."

In 2012, Wilkinson published his fifth book (and second through Oxford University Press), Cosmic Constitutional Theory: Why Americans Are Losing Their Inalienable Right to Self-Governance. The following year, Wilkinson wrote an opinion upholding the Baltimore Ravens' use of its previously used "Flying B" logo in videos, photographs and displays as fair use.

In 2016, Wilkinson dissented when Judge G. Steven Agee found that sectarian prayers offered by Rowan County, North Carolina commissioners at their meetings did not violate the Establishment Clause of the United States Constitution.  That judgment was then rejected by the full circuit en banc by a vote of 10–5, with Wilkinson now writing for the majority while Agee and Paul V. Niemeyer authored dissents. In June 2018, the Supreme Court of the United States denied review, over the written dissent of Justice Clarence Thomas joined by Neil Gorsuch.

In 2017 Wilkinson published, All Falling Faiths: Reflections on the Promise and Failure of the 1960s.

In March 2018, Wilkinson wrote a dissent when the circuit denied en banc rehearing to a divided panel's conclusion that the Bladensburg Peace Cross memorial from World War I now violated the Constitution's Establishment Clause. The Fourth Circuit's judgment was then reversed by the U.S. Supreme Court in American Legion v. American Humanist Association (2019).

In August 2018, Wilkinson wrote for the panel majority when it found that the Constitution's Eighth Amendment did not prevent Virginia from criminally prohibiting those it identified as "habitual drunkards" from possessing alcohol.  Judge Diana Gribbon Motz specially concurred, arguing that the majority was ignoring Powell v. Texas (1968). In July 2019, the full circuit en banc reversed the panel by a vote of 8–7, with Motz writing for the majority and Wilkinson now writing the principal dissent. The majority and concurring opinions criticized Wilkinson for incivility and "inflammatory language", which Wilkinson defended in an additional, special dissent.

Writings
Wilkinson has published numerous editorials, law review articles and six books:
.
.
.
.
.
 All Falling Faiths:  Reflections on the Promise and Failure of the 1960s, Description, preview, and book reviews. Encounter, 2017.

Honors and awards
In 2004, the University of Virginia awarded Wilkinson the Thomas Jefferson Foundation Medal in Law, its highest external honor.

In 2009, the Lawrenceville School awarded him its highest honor.

In 2016, the John Barbee Minor Inn of Court in Charlottesville recognized Wilkinson's three decades of judicial service with a Certificate of Merit and Lifetime Achievement Award.

See also 
 George W. Bush Supreme Court candidates
 List of law clerks of the Supreme Court of the United States (Seat 1)

References

External links
 

1944 births
Living people
20th-century American judges
American legal scholars
Judges of the United States Court of Appeals for the Fourth Circuit
Law clerks of the Supreme Court of the United States
Lawyers from New York City
Lawyers from Richmond, Virginia
United States court of appeals judges appointed by Ronald Reagan
University of Virginia School of Law alumni
University of Virginia School of Law faculty
Virginia Republicans
Writers from New York City
Writers from Richmond, Virginia
Yale College alumni
St. Christopher's School (Richmond, Virginia) alumni